The 1967 North Indian Ocean cyclone season had no bounds, but cyclones tend to form between April and December, with peaks in May and November. These dates conventionally delimit the period of each year when most tropical cyclones form in the northern Indian Ocean. There are two main seas in the North Indian Ocean—the Bay of Bengal to the east of the Indian subcontinent and the Arabian Sea to the west of India. The official Regional Specialized Meteorological Centre in this basin is the India Meteorological Department (IMD), while the Joint Typhoon Warning Center releases unofficial advisories. An average of four to six storms form in the North Indian Ocean every season with peaks in May and November. Cyclones occurring between the meridians 45°E and 100°E are included in the season by the IMD.



Systems

Cyclone Two (02B)

Cyclone Ten (10B)

On October 12, an intense cyclone struck the state of Odisha and left complete devastation along its path.

Tropical Storm Eleven (11B)

Cyclone Twelve (12B)

Cyclone Fifteen (15B)

See also

 North Indian Ocean tropical cyclone
 List of tropical cyclone records
 1967 Atlantic hurricane season
 1967 Pacific hurricane season
 1967 Pacific typhoon season
 Australian region cyclone seasons: 1966–67 1967–68
 South Pacific cyclone seasons: 1966–67 1967–68
 South-West Indian Ocean cyclone seasons: 1966–67 1967–68

References

External links
India Meteorological Department
Joint Typhoon Warning Center 

 
Tropical cyclones in India
1967 in India